Bakuryū Sentai Abaranger 20th: The Unforgivable Fury (爆竜戦隊アバレンジャー20th: 許されざるアバレ, Bakuryū Sentai Abarenjā Tsuentiethu Yurusa Rezaru Abare) is an upcoming Japanese superhero tokusatsu film which celebrates the 20th anniversary of Bakuryū Sentai Abaranger TV series upon which the movie is based on. It is scheduled to be released in theaters in 2023.

The film tells the story of a new threat that comes to the Earth, all while Bakuryū Sentai Abaranger faces a new hardship in the face of public disapproval.

Plot 
20 years have passed since Bakuryū Sentai Abaranger protected the Earth from various threats. Now, the peaceful lives of Ryoga, Yukito, Ranru and others are disturbed by a new dangerous threat to the Earth. Meanwhile, public negatively reacts to the heroic actions of Abaranger, making it another hardship Abaranger has to come through.

Cast 
Koichiro Nishi as Ryouga Hakua/AbaRed
Shou Tomita as Yukito Sanjyou/AbareBlue
Aiko Ito as Ranru Itsuki/AbareYellow
Kaoru Abe as Asuka/AbareBlack
Kotaro Tanaka as Mikoto Nakadai/AbareKiller
Michi Nishijima as Emiri Imanaka
Kyōsei Tsukui as Trinoid 12: Yatsudenwani

Release

Theatrical 
The movie is scheduled to be released in Japanese theaters in 2023.

Physical 
Bakuryū Sentai Abaranger 20th: The Unforgivable Fury will be released on physical media on March 27, 2024.

References 

Upcoming films
2023 films
Super Sentai films
2020s superhero films
2020s Japanese superhero films
Films about dinosaurs
Kaiju films
Giant monster films
2023 action drama films
2023 science fiction films
2023 fantasy films
2023 action films
2020s Japanese-language films